The 16th government of Turkey (10 September 1947 – 10 June 1948) was a government in the history of Turkey. It is also called the first Saka government.

Background 
Recep Peker of the Republican People's Party (CHP), who was the previous prime minister, resigned on 9 September 1947 after a harsh discussions in the parliament.  İsmet İnönü, the president, assigned Hasan Saka, a more moderate politician, as the prime minister. Saka's government was, however, similar to that of Peker.

The government
In the list below, the  cabinet members who served only a part of the cabinet's lifespan are shown in the column "Notes".

Aftermath

Saka was criticized as too mild to struggle against the Democrat Party opposition. He resigned on 8 July 1948. However, ten days later, he founded his second government.

References

Cabinets of Turkey
Republican People's Party (Turkey) politicians
1947 establishments in Turkey
1948 disestablishments in Turkey
Cabinets established in 1947
Cabinets disestablished in 1948
Members of the 16th government of Turkey
8th parliament of Turkey
Republican People's Party (Turkey)